John Francis (1846 – 6 April 1891) was a New Zealand cricketer. He played in one first-class match for Wellington in 1880/81.

See also
 List of Wellington representative cricketers

References

External links
 

1846 births
1891 deaths
New Zealand cricketers
Wellington cricketers
People from Epping